Draga may refer to:

People 
 Draga (surname)
 Draga (given name)

Geography 

In Croatia:
 Mošćenička Draga, a village and a municipality in Primorje-Gorski Kotar County
 Draga, Požega-Slavonia County, a village near Velika, Croatia
 Draga, Rijeka, an area of the city of Rijeka, Primorje-Gorski Kotar County

In Romania:
 Valea Dragă River, Romania
 Draga, a village in Silivașu de Câmpie Commune, Bistriţa-Năsăud County, Romania

In Serbia:
 Draga (Tutin), a village in the Municipality of Sandzak

In Slovenia:
 Draga, Ig, a settlement in the Municipality of Ig
 Draga, Loški Potok, a settlement in the Municipality of Loški Potok
 Draga, Nova Gorica, a settlement in the Municipality of Nova Gorica
 Draga pri Šentrupertu, a settlement in the Municipality of Šentrupert
 Draga pri Sinjem Vrhu, a settlement in the Municipality of Črnomelj
 Draga, Škofja Loka, a settlement in the Municipality of Škofja Loka
 Draga, Šmarješke Toplice, a settlement in the Municipality of Šmarješke Toplice
 Draga, Štore, a settlement in the Municipality of Štore
 Draga (valley), a valley in Begunje na Gorenjskem
 Spodnja Draga, a settlement in the Municipality of Ivančna Gorica
 Volčja Draga, a settlement in the Municipality of Renče–Vogrsko
 Zgornja Draga, a settlement in the Municipality of Ivančna Gorica

Other 
 NK Draga, Croatian football team
 Draga (Stargate), a fictional character in Stargate Infinity

See also 
 Draaga, fictional character in DC Comics
 Drage (disambiguation)